Polly Ann (also known as The Little Reformer and Pernickety Polly Ann) is a lost 1917 American silent comedy-drama film produced and distributed by the Triangle Film Corporation. It was directed by Charles Miller and stars Bessie Love.

Plot 

In rural New Hampshire, Orphan Polly Ann (Love) leaves the poor farm to work at the village tavern, run by Jud Simpkins (Lockney). When a traveling theater troupe comes to town, actor Hubert de Courcey (Foss) convinces Polly Ann to become an actress and leave with them. Village schoolteacher Howard Straightlane (Lee) intervenes, and takes Polly Ann under his wing. When a sick relative in Boston sends for Polly Ann, she goes to care for the relative, and nurses him back to health. When she learns that this relative and Howard are uncle and nephew, Polly Ann facilitates a reunion between them. The uncle then gives his blessing for Polly Ann and Howard to marry.

Cast

Reception 
Although the plot was considered unoriginal by its reviewers, the film did well at the box office.

References

External links 

 
 
 

1917 comedy-drama films
1917 lost films
1917 films
American black-and-white films
1910s English-language films
American silent feature films
Films set in Boston
Films set in New Hampshire
Lost American films
Triangle Film Corporation films
Lost comedy-drama films
1910s American films
Silent American comedy-drama films